Porpoloma is a genus of fungi in the family Tricholomataceae. The genus contains about 12 species found predominantly in South America. Porpoloma was described by mycologist Rolf Singer in 1952 with P. sejunctum as the type species.

Species
Porpoloma adrianii
Porpoloma amyloideum
Porpoloma aranzadii
Porpoloma bambusarum
Porpoloma boninense
Porpoloma coyan
Porpoloma elytroides
Porpoloma juncicola
Porpoloma mesotephrum
Porpoloma penetrans
Porpoloma pes-caprae
Porpoloma portentosum
Porpoloma sejunctum
Porpoloma spinulosum
Porpoloma terreum

See also

List of Tricholomataceae genera

References

Tricholomataceae
Agaricales genera
Taxa named by Rolf Singer